The 2006 Champ Car Atlantic season was the 33rd season of the Champ Car Atlantic Championship. It began April 9 at Long Beach and concluded September 24 at Road America. The Yokohama Presents the Champ Car Atlantic Championship Powered by Mazda Drivers' Champion was Simon Pagenaud driving for Team Australia.

Teams and drivers

Schedule

(O) Oval/Speedway

Season Summary

Race results

Final driver standings

See also
 2006 Champ Car season
 2006 Indianapolis 500
 2006 IndyCar Series season
 2006 Indy Pro Series season

External links
ChampCarStats.com

Atlantic Championship seasons
Atlantic Season, 2006
Atlantic Season 2006
Atlantic series